Craig Raudman (born August 6, 1961) is a former NASCAR driver from Redding, California. He won the 2001 NASCAR Featherlite Southwest Tour championship. He only competed in one Busch Series event. It came in 2002, when he ran the event at Las Vegas for Jay Robinson Racing. Raudman started 42nd and managed his way to 32nd by day's end.

He also competed in 20 K&N Pro Series West events as a driver, with 1 Top-5 and 7 Top-10. Raudman competed in 168 NASCAR Southwest Series races, with 14 wins, 57 Top-5, 93 Top-10 and 19 pole-positions. He was the 2001 NASCAR Featherlite Southwest Tour Champion.

Raudman also competed in two NASCAR Northwest Series events, with a best-finish of 4th at Portland International Raceway.

He was also crew chief for Jonathon Gomez, Justin Allgaier, Brian Ickler, Kelly Admiraal and several others in the NASCAR K&N Pro Series West and also in NASCAR Pinty's Series.

Motorsports career results

NASCAR
(key) (Bold – Pole position awarded by qualifying time. Italics – Pole position earned by points standings or practice time. * – Most laps led.)

Busch Series

References

External links
 
 
 Jonathon Gomez Racing

Living people
1961 births
People from Redding, California
Racing drivers from California
NASCAR drivers
NASCAR crew chiefs